AB, Ab, or ab may refer to:

In arts and media
 Abhishek Bachchan, an Indian actor
 Alter Bridge, an American hard rock band
 American Bandstand, a music-performance television show
 Amitabh Bachchan, an Indian actor
 Analecta Bollandiana, an academic journal
 Ancienne Belgique, a Belgian concert hall located in Brussels

In business

Business terminology
 Akcinė bendrovė, Lithuanian equivalent of an S.A. corporation
 Aktiebolag, Swedish for "corporation", similar to AG, Ltd or Inc

Businesses
 A & B High Performance Firearms, a defunct sporting firearms manufacturer
 AB Airlines, a defunct British airline 
 AB Groupe, a French broadcasting group
 Activision Blizzard, American holding company for Activision and Blizzard Entertainment
 Air Berlin (IATA airline code AB)
 Alderson-Broaddus College, a liberal-arts college in West Virginia
 Alfa-Beta Vassilopoulos, a Greek supermarket chain
 Allen-Bradley, a brand of industrial control products, manufactured by Rockwell Automation
 AllianceBernstein (New York Stock Exchange Symbol AB), a US-based asset management firm
 American Biograph, AB used as a film logo
 Anheuser-Busch, the world's third largest brewing company

Occupations and ranks
 Able Seaman (occupation), a civilian occupation
 Able Seaman (rank), a naval rank
 Airman Basic, the lowest rank in the United States Air Force

Organizations
 Afrikaner Broederbond, a South African secret society from 1918 to 1994
 Aryan Brotherhood, an American gang

Places
 Anzab-e Olya, also called Ab, a village in Iran
 AB postcode area, UK, including Aberdeen, Scotland
 Atlantic Beach, FL, also called AB, a city in the United States
 Albania (WMO country code)
 Alberta (Canadian Province/Territory Code)
 Air Base, used by the United States Air Force for overseas bases
 Aschaffenburg, Germany (on vehicle registration plates)

Science, technology and mathematics

Medicine
 AB blood, a blood type in the ABO blood group system
 AB toxin, Type III toxin secreted by some pathogenic bacteria
 Antibody, a medical abbreviation
 Abs, common name for the rectus abdominis muscle, a paired stomach muscle

Other uses in science, technology, and mathematics
 AB (star catalogue), Azzopardi / Breysacher catalogue of Wolf Rayet stars in the Small Magellanic Cloud
 Aggregate base
 Albite, a feldspar mineral
 Ammonia borane, a chemical compound.
 Alabamine, a former name of Astatine.
 AB Class amplifier, a classification of electric amplifier
 The category of abelian groups (Ab), in mathematics
 NZR Ab class a New Zealand steam locomotive 
 Antibonding (a.b.), used to describe the character of orbitals in atomic and molecular electronic structure
 ApacheBench, a command line tool for Apache HTTP Server
 Armed boarding steamer, used by the United Kingdom during World War I, for boarding enemy vessels

In religion
 Ab (Egyptian heart-soul concept), a concept of the heart-soul in ancient Egyptian religion
 Ab., a Hebrew abbreviation related to Pirkei Avot, a compilation of teachings and maxims from the Mishnaic period
 Aitareya Brahmana, an ancient Indian collection of sacred hymns

In sport

Association football
 Akademisk Boldklub, a Danish professional football club
 Argja Bóltfelag, a Faroese association football club

Rugby union
 All Blacks, New Zealand's national rugby union team
 Aviron Bayonnais, French rugby union club

Other
 AB de Villiers, South African middle order batsman and wicket-keeper
 Adrien Broner, American Boxer, nicknamed AB
 Allan Border, Australian cricketer, nicknamed A.B.
 Antonio Brown, American football player, nicknamed AB
 At Bat, in baseball statistics

Other uses
 Ab (cuneiform), a written syllable
 Ab (given name), a short form of Albert (or occasionally Abraham or Abbott)
 Ab (Semitic), a Semitic word for "father"
 ab, a Welsh patronymic
 Āb (water) or ap, a Persian word for "water"
 AB, a South Australian dish made of hot potato chips, gyro meat and sauces, similar to a Halal snack pack
 Abkhaz language (ISO 639-1 language code ab), a Northwest Caucasian language spoken mostly by the Abkhaz people
 Adult baby, a person who practices paraphilic infantilism
 Anno Bengal, a Bengali calendar
 Artium baccalaureus, Latin for Bachelor of Arts
 Assembly Bill, a type of legislation in the United States
 Absolute Beginner, a German rap group

See also
 A/B (disambiguation)
 BA (disambiguation)
 A-flat (disambiguation) ("A"), the musical note, scale, or key
 Av, a month in the Hebrew calendar
 Aβ, Beta amyloid, peptides of amino acids that are involved in Alzheimer's disease